State Route 384 (SR 384) is a  state highway in the northeast part of the U.S. state of Georgia. It travels southeast-to-northwest along Duncan Bridge Road from US 23/SR 365 in the western part of Baldwin to SR 75 southeast of Helen. The route serves as a gateway to Helen and the North Georgia mountains.

Route description
SR 384 begins at an intersection with US 23/SR 365 (Tommy Irwin Parkway) in the western part of Baldwin in southwestern Habersham County. The route heads northwest and crosses the Chattahoochee River into White County. The highway has an intersection with SR 254. Almost immediately, in Leaf, is an intersection with SR 115 (Clarkesville Highway). The route bends to the north-northeast and intersects SR 255 in Stovall Mill. SR 384 curves back to the northwest. It then meets its northern terminus, an intersection with SR 75 (Helen Highway), southeast of Helen.

SR 384 is not part of the National Highway System, a system of roadways important to the nation's economy, defense, and mobility.

History
The roadway that would eventually become SR 384 was established between 1963 and 1966 on an alignment from Alto to Leaf. In 1971, that roadway was extended along the path of current SR 384 to the intersection with SR 75. By March 1980, the southern terminus was shifted to the current location in Baldwin. In 1988, the entire roadway was designated as SR 384.

Major intersections

See also

References

External links

 Georgia Roads (Routes 381 - 399)
 Georgia State Route 384 on State-Ends.com

384
Transportation in Habersham County, Georgia
Transportation in White County, Georgia